Black Mountain State Forest is a  state forest in Haverhill, New Hampshire, on the western slopes of Black Mountain, a  summit at the western edge of the White Mountains. In 1920 a report was issued on the state forest area that was then  and included a Black Mountain Lookout Station (no longer present). It was composed of pasture and young spruce. The original tract was purchased in 1919 and 1920. The state forest is bordered to the east by the White Mountain National Forest, which covers the summit of the mountain.

See also

List of New Hampshire state forests

References

External links
 U.S. Geological Survey Map at the U.S. Geological Survey Map Website. Retrieved December 6th, 2022.

New Hampshire state forests
Protected areas established in 1919
1919 establishments in New Hampshire
Haverhill, New Hampshire